Nigali Band village is located in Krishnapur Municipality of Kanchanpur District.

References

External links
 Kanchanpur District

Populated places in Kanchanpur District